Romancing SaGa 2 is a 1993 role-playing video game developed and published by Square for the Super Famicom. It is the fifth entry in the SaGa series. It received an expanded port for Japanese mobile devices from Square Enix in 2011. This version was remastered by ArtePiazza and released worldwide between 2016 and 2017  by Square Enix for Nintendo Switch, PlayStation 4, PlayStation Vita, Android, iOS, Microsoft Windows and Xbox One.

Set during the history of the kingdom of Avalon, the player takes on the role of a dynasty of rulers as they fight the Seven Heroes, former saviors of the world corrupted into demons. Gameplay features nonlinear exploration and expansion of the game world and narrative, with the turn-based battles featuring group formations. As with other SaGa titles, there are no experience points and character attributes and skills are dependent on actions taken in battle. A key mechanic is choosing the next ruler of Avalon, who will inherit the abilities of the previous ruler.

Production began in 1992 after a prolonged concept period during which original staff were working on the Final Fantasy series. Returning staff members including series creator Akitoshi Kawazu as director, lead designer and writer; illustrator Tomomi Kobayashi; and composer Kenji Ito. The delayed start to production allowed Kawazu to rethink the game design, changing the multiple protagonists of Romancing SaGa to focus on a single dynastic line with associated gameplay elements. The remaster, which was initiated by Kawazu, adjusted to remove bugs while preserving the sprite artwork.

Romancing SaGa 2 is the best-selling of the three Romancing SaGa titles, having sold over 1.5 million copies in Japan. Reception of the original version was generally positive, while its worldwide remaster also saw praise from critics for its battle system and inheritance mechanic. The original Japanese release was supplemented by multiple guidebooks and a manga adaptation.

Gameplay
In Romancing SaGa 2, the player plays as the Emperor or Empress of Avalon, a castle located in the northwest corner of the game's world map. The Treasurer, in the throne room, tells the player the fund reserve in his or her castle treasury. Development of new equipment and spells, and establishment of services in Avalon will consume funds. The Treasurer also fills the Emperor with walking about funds if the player needs it. Also in the throne room is the Accountant. He tells the player how much money he or she collects per battle. When the player controls more land on the map, the amount increases. In the southeast corner of the throne room is the Chancellor. He tells the player what problems need to be solved in the world and where to solve them. Solving the problems he points out aids the player to advance to the next generation. The Fighters are the default characters that join the player early in the game. They are not the best characters, but as the player advances through the game, he or she will get other characters who specialize in areas that the Fighters are weak in. The Formation Soldiers demonstrate any battle formations the player happens to know and will collaborate with the player to make new formations. If the heir the player chooses knows a formation, it is recommended that the player consult the Formation Soldiers. Throughout the game, the player will be able to expand the capital. They will not appear until the player cleared a generation though after accepting the offers to start the public works.

Synopsis
In the backstory of Romancing SaGa 2, a group of seven warriors dubbed the Seven Heroes who saved the world from monster invasions but vanished immediately afterwards. After a millennium, the Seven Heroes have returned, but are now corrupted by dark powers and begin attacking the continent. Leon, ruler of Avalon, begins a campaign against the Seven Heroes which is passed down to his younger son Gerard after he dies, then on to subsequent heirs named by each ruler and inheriting their abilities through a special spell. Over time, Avalon expands into an empire, with its ruler and a chosen group of warriors killing each of the Seven Heroes.

When six of the seven are defeated and the final Emperor or Empress takes power, it is revealed that the Seven Heroes faced up to this point were copies, and the seventh copy has gone to protect the Heroes' original bodies. The final Emperor or Empress, whose inheritance magic has worn off, defeats first the final copy, then the true Seven Heroes. The story is bookended by a minstrel retelling the game's events and concluding that the Empire of Avalon was turned into a commonwealth after the Seven Heroes' defeat; the still-living Emperor or Empress listens to the minstrel. Later versions of Romancing SaGa 2 include an optional dungeon revealing that the Seven Heroes were betrayed by their people the Ancients due to fear of the power they gained by absorbing monsters with an earlier version of the inheritance spell, returning from the realm of monsters to exact revenge on the Ancients.

Development
Following the completion and release of Romancing SaGa in early 1992, almost all staff from the title were recruited to work on the latest Final Fantasy title, meaning production on any SaGa sequels were halted. Ultimately series creator Akitoshi Kawazu was pleased, as he would otherwise have had no time to innovate on the Romancing SaGa design and might well have left Romancing SaGa 2 mechanically similar to its predecessor. Production began in April when new employees had joined the company and Kawazu could create a production team. Kawazu acted as director, lead designer, and scenario writer. The only returning staff besides Kawazu were programmers Yuki Anasawa and Hiroshi Takai, illustrator Tomomi Kobayashi, and the sound team of composer Kenji Ito and sound designer Minoru Akao. The mostly-new staff meant that Kawazu's sometimes-drastic changes to the game mechanics were easily accepted. Production lasted one year, and had a staff of around twenty people. The staff included planner Akihiko Matsui, who joined the project following work on Final Fantasy V and would go on to co-direct Chrono Trigger; and future composer Yasunori Mitsuda as a sound designer. Another new team member was Kyoji Koizumi, who helped design the battle system. Kazuyuki Ikumori acted as graphic designer, with his work focusing on background environments, and the opening and ending sequences. This was his only work on SaGa as he was transferred into the Final Fantasy series later on. It was produced by Tetsuo Mizuno, then-president of Square who would go on to found AlphaDream.

Kawazu wrote the scenario in parallel to the gameplay system development, with some planned story elements needing to be dropped due to cartridge limitations. Changing from the multiple disparate protagonists of Romancing SaGa, the narrative and gameplay instead focused on a ruling dynasty over several generations. Written as a traditional fantasy, the narrative was designed to advance based on the number and order of bosses defeated, with almost all other elements being a wide selection that player could choose from freely. The Seven Heroes were portrayed in-game as former allies who had drifted apart to pursue their own goals in subsequent years. Subier was the first of the Seven Heroes to be created, with his name being a double meaning pun on the Japanese god Ebisu and the Ebisu neighbourhood where Square was based. The names of male members in the Japanese versions were anagrams of station names along the Yamanote Line. The one female member Rocbouquet was a challenge, with Kawazu eventually making her name an anagram of Ikebukuro, a commercial center in Tokyo. Their concept and number drew inspiration from the Seven Lucky Gods.

As with other SaGa titles, the gameplay mechanics were laid out first before the storyline and worldview, with the leading mechanic this time being the inheritance of skills through a lineage. The inheritance mechanic was part of a scrapped concept for the original SaGa. The central concept was that while the game's ending was set, what happened during the intervening millennium of history was up to the player. As with other entries, the gameplay was designed to be open-ended and influenced a great deal by player choices. Kobayashi was surprised at hearing of a sequel to Romancing SaGa, and being asked back to design the cast. Compared to her book illustrations with at most six characters, Romancing SaGa 2 had dozens of characters to design. She began with characters from the Avalon Empire, particularly the first two rulers Leon and Gerard. Leon was originally designed with dark skin and a dour look, but this was scrapped, with the current version being designed around a long-haired flamboyant type. Gerard's role and personality resulted in a more youthful and "boyish" design, though she had hoped to design a more unconventional protagonist after her work on Romancing SaGa. Her favorite character designs were the more challenging ones, such as the android character Coppelia.

Music

Following his work on Romancing SaGa, Ito was left feeling completely burned out. Recalling his work on the game, Ito said he had worked through feelings of suffering from that creative exhaustion. He worked as both composer and arranger on the title. As with Romancing SaGa, Ito differentiated the soundtrack from the music of Final Fantasy by adding more percussion instruments. The soundtrack includes arrangements of tracks by Nobuo Uematsu; "Heartful Tears" from The Final Fantasy Legend, and "The Legend Begins" from its sequel.

Two music albums were published by NTT Publishing in 1995, the official soundtrack and an arrange album. A remastered album was released in 2014 by Square Enix, which included the original main battle theme which had been left out of the original album release. The remaster was supervised by Ito. A reissue which included an interview with Kawazu and Ito was released in 2020

Release
Romancing SaGa 2 was released on December 10, 1993. Three guidebooks were published by NTT Publishing in association with Square; two in December 1993, and a complete guide in February 1994. A manga adaptation was released in three volumes by Tokuma Shoten between August 1994 and April 1995. The first volume was written by Hiroshi Morimoto, while the rest was written by Mayumi Hazuki. All volumes were illustrated by Kazuki Mendo. Like the other Super Famicom SaGa titles, Romancing SaGa 2 was never released outside Japan. Square localization staff member Ted Woolsey attributed it to a lack of manpower and the wish to keep staff on the production of Final Fantasy VII and Trials of Mana. In a later interview, Kawazu attributed the lack of localization both to its unconventional gameplay and the large amount of text in need of translation.

The game received Virtual Console re-releases on the Wii in 2010, the Wii U in 2014, and the New Nintendo 3DS in 2017. The Wii version became unavailable with the shutdown of Wii's online services. For these versions, the game received a higher-than-expected CERO rating due to references to alcohol and drugs. The game was ported to mobile phones. It originally released for i-mode on November 1, 2010; an EZweb version followed on Marsh 3, 2011. The port included a new dungeon called the Maze of Memories, featuring the background lore for the Seven Heroes. Several bugs and exploits from the original were fixed, with a new area included to replace a popular exploit to increase in-game funds. New character classes were distributed as paid downloadable content. This version shut down in 2018, when the services for older mobile titles were shut down.

Remaster
Kawazu had been considering remaking or remastering Romancing SaGa 2 since 2012 for smartphones. It was chosen due to its popularity, and the fact that Kawazu had already remade Romancing SaGa for the PlayStation 2. He approached multiple companies in Japan and overseas, but abandoning the idea as phone technology at the time was still not able to handle that type of game. The remaster was produced by ArtePiazza, who had previously worked on ports of the Dragon Quest series. Kawazu was introduced by ArtePiazza based on this work, and while initially concerned about there being too many changes, ArtePiazza's enthusiasm for the project and their wish to remain faithful to the original assuaged his doubts. While generally faithful, the remaster included animated sprites for the Seven Heroes boss characters, and redesigned and adjustable UI which allowed for touchscreen operation and player customization.

The remaster was designed using the Unity game engine, chosen for its convenience when porting to other platforms and user-friendly technology. Similarly, the pixel art resolution was left unaltered, with the team instead enlarging and multiplying the pixels used to bring the Super Famicom sprites up to modern graphical standards. This was done partly for budgetary reasons, and partly due to fan love of the original. While it was considered to adjust the game balance to make the game easier, the team decided instead to directly port the earlier mobile re-release. The only adjustments made were further bug fixes. One of the most frequent issues with updating the graphics was creating sharper background designs while preserving the pixel art of players and enemies, while also accounting for the gameplay display and mechanics around enemy encounters. Through all these adjustments, the remaster includes all the code from the Super Famicom original.

The game was first released in Japan on March 24, 2016 for Android, iOS and PlayStation Vita by Square Enix. Following the Japanese release, popular demand prompted a Western release of the port. Part of the wish behind the localization in addition to a Japanese release was requests from fans worldwide to revive the SaGa series following a prolonged period of dormancy. The remaster's producer Masanori Ichikawa noted that releasing the game across so many platforms was a new challenge to Square Enix, as Xbox and Steam are not as popular in Japan but are popular worldwide. The Western version released first on iOS and Android on May 26, 2016. The Western Vita version was initially delayed due to unspecified issues. On December 15, 2017, it released on Vita, Nintendo Switch, PlayStation 4, Microsoft Windows and Xbox One. These later versions included auto save, Xbox Play Anywhere support, cross save between Vita and PS4, as well as an option to turn off the remastering content and play it just like it was originally made.

Reception

In Japan, the game topped the Famitsu sales chart in December 1993. Romancing SaGa 2 went on to sell nearly 1.5 million copies worldwide, as of March 2003. It is the best-selling entry in the original Romancing SaGa trilogy, followed by the original game and Romancing SaGa 3. Famitsu gave it a score of 26 out of 40.

GameRevolution reviewed this title for the Nintendo Switch, saying that the game at first appears like a very average game from the time it originally came out, but praised the system of choices that changes and guides the gameplay, as well as the unique aspect of ruling an empire and eventually being about to issue commands to followers. Nintendo World Report said the game lacked interesting stories or characters, but called the gameplay system rewarding with many weapons to choose from and skill points to use.

Reviewing the PlayStation 4 version, Push Square disdained the menu system taken from the previous mobile remake, and noted balance issues that made the traditional process of leveling up characters potentially hurt the player as the bosses grow stronger as you do.

Reviewing the iOS version of the game, TouchArcade loved how radically different it was from what kinds of games Square Enix had released in the Apple App Store until then. Despite enjoying the game, they noted the games unexplained gameplay systems and called the games balance system "atrocious". They also mentioned the poor translation into English and the lack of Mifi game controller support.

Legacy
Romancing Saga 2 expanded the non-linear gameplay of its predecessor. While in the original Romancing Saga, scenarios were changed according to dialogue choices during conversations, Romancing Saga 2 further expanded on this by having unique storylines for each character that can change depending on the player's actions, including who is chosen, what is said in conversation, what events have occurred, and who is present in the party. Several of the game music tracks were featured in Theatrhythm Final Fantasy: Curtain Call as downloadable content.

PCGamesN credits Romancing SaGa 2 for having laid the foundations for modern Japanese role-playing video games. The game's progressive, non-linear, open world design and subversive themes influenced modern Japanese role-playing video games such as Final Fantasy XII (which Akitoshi Kawazu worked on), Final Fantasy XV, Nier: Automata and The Legend of Zelda: Breath of the Wild.

Notes

References

External links
Official Mobile Phone version website 

1993 video games
Android (operating system) games
Fantasy video games
IOS games
Japan-exclusive video games
Mobile games
Nintendo Switch games
PlayStation 4 games
PlayStation Vita games
Role-playing video games
SaGa
Science fantasy video games
Single-player video games
Super Nintendo Entertainment System games
Video games developed in Japan
Video games featuring protagonists of selectable gender
Video games scored by Kenji Ito
Virtual Console games
Virtual Console games for Wii U
Windows games
Xbox One games
Xbox Play Anywhere games